Daniel Zaragoza (born December 11, 1957) is a Mexican former professional boxer who competed from 1980 to 1997. He is a world champion in two weight classes, having held the WBC bantamweight title in 1985 and the WBC super bantamweight title between 1988 and 1997.

Amateur career
 1979 Represented Mexico as a bantamweight at the Pan-American Games in San Juan, Puerto Rico. Results were:
 Defeated Alfonso Abata (Ecuador)
 Lost to Jackie Beard (United States) points
 Represented Mexico as a bantamweight at the 1980 Moscow Olympic Games. Results were:
 Defeated Philip Sutcliffe (Ireland) points
 Defeated Ray Gilbody (Great Britain) points
 Lost to Michael Anthony (Guyana) TKO by 2

Professional career
In October 1980, Zaragoza won his pro debut against Ernesto Gutierrez.

WBC Bantamweight Championship
In 1985 he captured the vacant WBC Bantamweight title with a disqualification victory over Freddie Jackson in Aruba.

He lost his title in his first defense to Miguel "Happy" Lora. In his next bout in 1986, he suffered a non-title loss to IBF Bantamweight Champion and future International Boxing Hall of Fame member Jeff Fenech in Australia.

WBC Super Bantamweight Championship
Zaragoza moved up in weight in his next bout and scored 7 consecutive wins before capturing the vacant WBC Super Bantamweight title with a knockout win over future hall of fame member Carlos Zarate in 1988.

He successfully retained the title five times, including a hard-fought draw in South Korea against IBF Super Bantamweight champion Lee Seung-hoon, a knockout victory against future champion Valerio Nati in Italy, a decision victory over Paul Banke (16-3-0) in the first fight of their trilogy, a knockout victory against Frankie Duarte (47-7-1), and a decision victory over former champion Chan-Yong Park in South Korea. In 1990, he lost the belt to Paul Banke whom he had defeated just three fights prior.

Banke would go on to lose the title by knockout against Pedro Ruben Decima, who in turn was knocked out by Kiyoshi Hatanaka. In 1991, Zaragoza regained the belt with a split decision win over Hatanaka in Japan. He defended the belt against Chun Huh (25-2-0) of South Korea and avenged his loss to Paul Banke. In 1992, he lost his title to Thierry Jacob by decision in France. In his next two fights he battled newly crowned WBC super bantamweight titleholder Tracy Harris Patterson, who had recently defeated Jacob. He fought to a draw with Patterson in the first bout and lost by technical knockout in the second bout when the fight was stopped due to a cut despite the objections of Zaragoza.

Oldest Super Bantamweight Champion
In 1995 he would yet again get another crack at the title against WBC Super Bantamweight champion Hector Acero Sánchez, who had defeated Tracy Harris Patterson to win the title. The bout was controversially ruled a draw with most observers believing Zaragoza should have been declared the winner. He fought a rematch with Sánchez later in the year and won the belt via split decision. At 36 years 11 months, he became the oldest super bantamweight champion in history.

This began a late-career surge for Zaragoza who was able to defend the title four times, including two wins against former and future champion Joichiro Tatsuyoshi in Japan, a tko win over Tsuyoshi Harada (20-1-0) also in Japan, and an upset win against undefeated bantamweight champion Wayne McCullough who had recently moved up in weight. On Sep 6, 1997, he lost his title to then-undefeated 21-year-old Erik Morales, who knocked out Zaragoza in the 11th round. Zaragoza retired after the bout at the age of 39 with a record of 55-8-3.

Retirement
He was inducted to the International Boxing Hall of Fame in 2004.

Professional boxing record

See also
List of Mexican boxing world champions
List of world bantamweight boxing champions
List of world super-bantamweight boxing champions

References

External links

International Boxing Hall of Fame Biography

 

|-

|-

1957 births
Living people
Mexican male boxers
Boxers from Mexico City
Boxers at the 1979 Pan American Games
Pan American Games competitors for Mexico
Olympic boxers of Mexico
Boxers at the 1980 Summer Olympics
World bantamweight boxing champions
World super-bantamweight boxing champions
World Boxing Council champions
International Boxing Hall of Fame inductees